Lady Sogwangjuwon of the Wang clan or known as Lady Ham was the daughter of Wang-Gyu who became the 17th wife of Taejo of Goryeo and bore him a son, Prince Gwangjuwon. Her older sister became Taejo's 16th wife and her younger sister became Hyejong's 2nd wife. After Taejo's death, Wang-Gyu was the person who was in charge of the important task of proclaiming Taejo to the inside and outside dynasties and later tried to assassinate Hyejong just to put his only grandson of the throne, but was failed and got executed in September 945.

Meanwhile, some scholars have mixed interpretations of Wang-Gyu's role and speculated if her son was killed because of her father's rebellion case. In fact, in most cases, the daughters of a rebels were also destroyed or killed together and it was speculated that she and her sisters also faced the same fate.

In popular culture
Portrayed by Seo Mi-ae in the 2002–2003 KBS TV series The Dawn of the Empire.

References

External links
소광주원부인 on Encykorea .
소광주원부인 on EToday News .

Year of birth unknown
Year of death unknown
Consorts of Taejo of Goryeo
People from Gwangju, Gyeonggi